Nikolay Matveyev (born 1912, date of death unknown) was a Soviet sailor. He competed in the 6 Metre event at the 1952 Summer Olympics.

References

External links
 

1912 births
Year of death missing
Soviet male sailors (sport)
Olympic sailors of the Soviet Union
Sailors at the 1952 Summer Olympics – 6 Metre
Place of birth missing